Luis Alberto del Paraná (21 June 1926 – 15 September 1974) was a Paraguayan singer and guitarist. During the fifties, sixties and early seventies, he traveled extensively around the globe with his group Los Paraguayos, popularizing Paraguayan music. He is the best-selling Paraguayan musician ever.

Family and early life

He was born on 21 June 1926 at 14:30 in Altos, Paraguay. His birth was reported in the magistrates court on 14 August 1926 by his mother, Jacinta Mesa (not Meza). His name was Luis Osmer Meza.

Luis was the fourth son of eight children, of whom one was a girl, Obdulia (Chiquita), a retired singer. Doña Jacinta, Paraná's mother died on 15 August 1965, while Luis was in Stockholm touring in Europe; Luis's father, who was a rural teacher, died in Piripucú, Concepción in 1947.

Luis attended primary school in Ypacaraí. At the age of 14, Luis entered the boy-scouts in "Batallón Rojas Silva " (Salesianito), under Father Ernesto Pérez Acosta's management.

Adult life and artistic career

"The fact that he was meant to be an artist was clear from the age of eighteen, when he interpreted 'Campo Grande' alongside Humberto Barúa and Digno García, a great harpist. It was there, in the old Rex theatre, that people started to feel attracted by this young, enthusiastic countryside boy."

After touring through Central America, Luis Alberto del Paraná (artistic name adopted in Mexico) formed a band with Digno García and Agustin Barboza. This band was named "Trío Los Paraguayos" and by decree, 24 November 1953, the national government gave each one of the members 3200 dollars to disseminate Paraguayan music in Europe through an "Official Cultural Mission".

His first wife was Lissette Cairoly, a French "circus princess". His second wife was Carmen González Caballero, a Spanish dancer. They had two children:  Luis Manuel Meza González and Carmen Fabiola Meza González.

In (1958), in Milan, (Italy), Paraná gave Father Pérez a complete set of percussion instruments for his former Scout Battalion to use. Later on, Paraná dedicated a song to Father Pérez. This song was included in an LP issued by Philips International and was distributed world wide.

When the contract expired, the band dissolved and Paraná formed the band "Los Paraguayos" with his brother Reynaldo Meza, Rubito Medina, and José de los Santos González, a harpist. They quickly recorded two LP's for Philips in the Netherlands: "Famous Latin American Songs" and "Ambassador of Romance", which had great success. This was the start of the recording of "more than 500 songs". They recorded hit after hit until Paraná died.

They shared the stage with The Beatles and recorded with The Rolling Stones.

Luis Alberto del Paraná and "Los Paraguayos" played live at the Benny Hill show "Season 1 Episode 3" (1970)

Luis Alberto del Paraná and "Los Paraguayos" sold more than 30 000 000 records, more than 650 000 tape cassettes, and traveled more than 1 000 000 kilometers during their tours.

Death and burial

He died on 15 September 1974, aged 48, in London, England. He was at the first floor of the Pembridge Court Hotel, in room eight when he suffered from a brain stroke.

His casket was transported to Asunción, where it was carried off the plane by many dignitaries, including the President. It was a huge event rarely seen by the nation. The people spontaneously packed the streets to say goodbye to their idol.

This event was named "The Chain of Pain" and almost all of the radio stations in Paraguay and many around the world tuned in to transmit every minute of the episode until his burial in "La Recoleta Cemetery", at the capital Asunción.

Discography

 Paraguayan Song Nº 1
 Paraguayan Song Nº 2
 Bajo el Cielo del Paraguay
 Famous Latin American Songs
 South American Minstrels
 Trovador Tropical
 Trovador Tropical Nº 2
 Tropical Trip
 Ambassadors of Romance
 Historia de un Amor
 Buenas noches mi amor
 En escena
 Para mí, Para tí, Paraná
 Sentimentally yours
 Canciones de las Américas
 La Burrerita de Ypacarai
 În România I
 În România II
 În România III
 În România IV
 În România V
 Mi Guitarra y mi Voz
 Felicidades
 Amici, Amici
 All Star Festival - UNICEF
 Acuarela Paraguaya
 Por todo el mundo...
 Paraguayos in Tokio
 Popular Favourites
 Music Minstrels Please
 San Remo 1966
 Fiesta Asuncena
 En Buenos Aires
 Con los Violines de Lima
 World Hits
 Live in Concert
 Siempre el mejor
 Espléndido
 In London
 Papillón
 Epopeya Nacional
 Éxtasis Tropìcal
 Latin American Dance Party
 Live in Concert... Berlín
 Canciones Tropicales
 Adiós Mariquita Linda
 Quizás, quizás, quizás

In popular culture
His recordings "Hace un Año" and "Malagueña" were used in the film Born on the Fourth of July (1989).
Paraná Awards are the most prominent awards for Paraguayan radio and television.

References

 International Jose Guillermo Carrillo Foundation
 Perfil de un Triunfador. De Bernardo Garcete Saldivar
 Paraná, Inmortal. De Bernardo Garcete Saldivar

1926 births
1974 deaths
20th-century Paraguayan male singers
Paraguayan guitarists
Paraguayan songwriters
People from Cordillera Department
20th-century guitarists